Aliiglaciecola lipolytica is a Gram-negative, non-spore-forming, rod-shaped and motile from the genus of Aliiglaciecola with a single polar flagellum which has been isolated from seawater in China.

References

External links
Type strain of Aliiglaciecola lipolytica at BacDive -  the Bacterial Diversity Metadatabase

Alteromonadales
Bacteria described in 2009